Mathew Mattam (1950/1 – 29 May 2016) was a Malayalam writer who authored about 300 novels.  His novels were regularly published in Mangalam Weekly, Manorama Weekly and other Malayalam periodicals. Anchu Sundarikal, Alippazham, Daivam Urangiyittilla, Profasarude Makal, Lakshamveedu and Roti are some of his major works. Two of his popular works - Karimbu and May Dinam - were made into movies. He died aged 65.

Major works
 Mazhavillu (മഴവില്ല്)
 Policekarante Makal (പോലീസുകാരന്റെ മകള്‍)
 Veendum Vasantham (വീണ്ടും വസന്തം)
 Nisagandhi (നിശാഗന്ധി)
 Onpatham Pramaanam (ഒന്‍പതാം പ്രമാണം)
 Kaivishom (കൈവിഷം)
 Manavatti (മണവാട്ടി)
 Daivam Urangiyittilla (ദൈവം ഉറങ്ങിയിട്ടില്ല)
 Thadankal Palayam (തടങ്കല്പ്പാളയം)
 Karimbu (കരിമ്പ്)
 Profasarude Makal (പ്രൊഫസറുടെ മകള്‍)
 Anchu Sundarikal (അഞ്ചു സുന്ദരികള്‍)
 Alippazham(ആലിപ്പഴം)
 Roti (റൊട്ടി)
 May Dinam (മെയ് ദിനം)
 Lakshamveedu ലക്ഷം വീട്)

References

1950s births
2016 deaths
Malayali people
People from Kottayam district
Novelists from Kerala
Indian male novelists
Malayalam-language writers
Malayalam novelists
20th-century Indian novelists
21st-century Indian novelists
20th-century Indian male writers
21st-century Indian male writers